Stock is a representation of capital paid or invested into a business entity by stockholders.

Stock may also refer to:

Places
Stock, Essex, England, a village and civil parish
Stock Windmill
Stock, Podlaskie Voivodeship, Poland, a village
Stock, Wiltshire, England, a small settlement
Stock Farm, a northern suburb of Roseau, Dominica
Stock Island, an island in the lower Florida Keys
Stock Township, Harrison County, Ohio, United States
Stock Township, Noble County, Ohio, United States

People
Stock (surname), a surname

Arts, entertainment, and media
Stock (album), by Akina Nakamori
Stock, a fictional town in Eastfarthing, in the works of J. R. R. Tolkien
Raw stock, undeveloped motion picture film
Stock character, a stereotypical fictional character who audiences readily recognize
Stock footage, film or video footage that can be used in other films
Stock photography, the supply of photographs licensed for specific uses
Stock sound effect, a prerecorded sound effect created for or contained within a sound effect library
Summer stock theatre, American theatre concept
Summer Stock, American film premised on Summer stock theatre

Biology

Animals
Stock (cage), a stall or cage used to restrain livestock
Fish stock, semi-discrete subpopulations of a particular species of fish
Foundation stock, individual or general type of horses used as the foundation animals that create a new breed or bloodline
Livestock, animals kept for agricultural purposes
Stock fish, a type of dried fish product

People
Old Stock Americans, descendants of the original settlers of the Thirteen Colonies, of mostly British ancestry, who colonized America in the 17th and the 18th centuries
Racial stock, an obsolete term referring to racial groups

Plants
Stock (flower) (Matthiola), a genus of flowering plants
Virginia stock (Malcolmia maritima), a garden plant

Brands and enterprises
Stock (publishing house), a French publisher and subsidiary of Hachette Livre, which itself is part of the Lagardère Group
Elliot Stock, a London publisher of the works of, among others, William Blades
Stock Spirits, a Polish company established in 1884
Stock Transportation, a Canadian school bus operator
Stock (supermarket), an  Paraguayan supermarket chain

Economics
Stock (also capital stock) of a corporation, all of the shares into which ownership of the corporation is divided
Stock (variable), in economics, business, or accounting, a variable measured at one specific time
STOCK Act, the Stop Trading on Congressional Knowledge Act, an Act of Congress designed to combat insider trading
Stock in trade or inventory, a supply of goods or materials held in storage by a business or household
Tally stick#Split tally, in ancient financial accounting, the part of a split tally stick used as a receipt in a transaction

Clothing 
Military stock, a leather collar issued to Napoleonic-era soldiers
Stock tie, a tie worn around the neck of a competitor riding in an equestrian event

Other uses
Stock (firearms), a part of a gun which interfaces with the shoulder or hand
Stock (food), a liquid flavoring base for soups and sauces
Stock (geology), an igneous rock formation
Stock, a type of changeling, a mythical creature
Card stock, a type of paper
Cattle catch or stocks, a move in some martial arts and wrestling
Infant bed, for sleeping babies, rarely called a stock
Label stock, a carrier for a label
Rolling stock, the vehicles that move on a railway
Stocks, a device for punishment or torture
Stöckli, sometimes called Stock, a traditional agricultural building in Switzerland and parts of Germany
Stock (dominoes), in dominoes, the tiles not picked up at the start which may be drawn later.
Bar stock, a common form of raw purified metal

See also
Stalk (disambiguation)
Standing stock (disambiguation)
Stocker (disambiguation)
Stocking (disambiguation)
Stocks (disambiguation)
Stocks (surname)